Felix Perez or Félix Pérez may refer to:

Politicians
Félix Manuel Pérez Miyares (born 1936), Spanish politician
Felix Perez Camacho (born 1957), American politician

Musicians
 Félix Pérez Cardozo (1908-1952), Paraguayan harpist

Sportspeople
 Félix Pérez (footballer) (1901-1983), Spanish footballer
 Félix Pérez (athlete) (born 1951), Venezuelan Olympic sprinter
 Félix Javier Pérez (1971–2005), Puerto Rican basketball player
 Félix Pérez (baseball) (born 1984), Cuban baseball player

Other
 Félix Pérez Cardozo, Paraguay, Paraguayan district named after harpist
 Felix Perez, fictional Cuban-American character on Shining Time Station
 Bishop Felix Paz Perez, Roman Catholic Bishop of Imus, Philippines, known for denouncing the Human rights abuses of the Marcos dictatorship

See also
 Pérez